Ferit Kaya (born 24 February 1984) is a Turkish actor of Zaza descent.

Life and career 
Kaya is a graduate of Mimar Sinan Fine Arts University State Conservatory with a degree in theatre studies. He first became known through his role in the TV series Kavak Yelleri (2007) but rose to prominence after appearing in Öyle Bir Geçer Zaman ki (2010) as Resul. In 2012, he had a recurring role in Kanal D's series Kötü Yol.

Ferit Kaya has continued his cinematic career and starred alongside Ata Demirer in the 2015 movie Niyazi Gül Dörtnala. He then briefly joined the cast of Arka Sokaklar and appeared in the series Familya. His breakthrough with his role as Murtaza in Çukur and as Zafer in the Netflix original series Fatma.

Filmography

References

External links 
 
 

1984 births
Turkish male film actors
Turkish male television actors
Mimar Sinan Fine Arts University alumni
Turkish people of Kurdish descent
Zaza people
People from Eğil
Living people